The Bishop of Southampton is an episcopal title used by a suffragan bishop of the Church of England Diocese of Winchester, in the Province of Canterbury, England. The title takes its name after the city of Southampton in Hampshire. The current bishop is Debbie Sellin.

On 20 May 2021, it was reported that Tim Dakin, Bishop of Winchester, had "stepped back" as Bishop for six weeks, in light of the threat of a Diocesan Synod motion of no confidence in his leadership. David Williams, Bishop of Basingstoke also "stepped back" and Sellin served as acting diocesan bishop. Dakin's and Williams' leave, and therefore Sellin's time as acting bishop, was later extended to the end of August 2021.

List of bishops

References

External links
 Crockford's Clerical Directory - Listings

Bishops of Southampton
Anglican suffragan bishops in the Diocese of Winchester